The list of hoards in Britain comprises significant archaeological hoards of coins, jewellery, precious and scrap metal objects and other valuable items discovered in Great Britain (England, Scotland and Wales). It includes both hoards that were buried with the intention of retrieval at a later date (personal hoards, founder's hoards, merchant's hoards, and hoards of loot), and also hoards of votive offerings which were not intended to be recovered at a later date, but excludes grave goods and single items found in isolation. The list is subdivided into sections according to archaeological and historical periods.

Neolithic hoards

Hoards dating to the Neolithic period, approximately 4000 to 2000 BC, comprise stone weapons and tools such as axeheads and arrowheads. Such hoards are very rare, and only a few are known from Britain.

Bronze Age hoards

A large number of hoards associated with the British Bronze Age, approximately 2700 BC to 8th century BC, have been found in Great Britain.  Most of these hoards comprise bronze tools and weapons such as axeheads, chisels, spearheads and knives, and in many cases may be founder's hoards buried with the intention of recovery at a later date for use in casting new bronze items.  A smaller number of hoards include gold torcs and other items of jewellery.  As coinage was not in use during the Bronze Age in Great Britain, there are no hoards of coins from this period.

Iron Age hoards

A large number of hoards associated with the British Iron Age, approximately 8th century BC to the 1st century AD, have been found in Britain. Most of the hoards comprise silver or gold Celtic coins known as staters, usually numbered in the tens or hundreds of coins, although the Hallaton Treasure contained over 5,000 silver and gold coins.  In addition to hoards of coins, a number of hoards of gold torcs and other items of jewellery have been found, including the Snettisham Hoard, the Ipswich Hoard and the Stirling Hoard.

In September 2020, 1,300 Celtic gold coins were discovered at a location in eastern England, dated back between 40 and 50 A.D.

Romano-British hoards

Hoards associated with the period of Romano-British culture when part of Great Britain was under the control of the Roman Empire, from AD 43 until about 410, as well as the subsequent Sub-Roman period up to the establishment of Anglo-Saxon kingdoms are the most numerous type of hoard found in Great Britain, and Roman coin hoards are particularly well represented, with over 1,200 known examples.  In addition to hoards composed largely or entirely of coins, a smaller number of hoards, such as the Mildenhall Treasure and the Hoxne Hoard, include items of silver or gold tableware such as dishes, bowls, jugs and spoons, or items of silver or gold jewellery.

Anglo-Saxon hoards

Hoards associated with the Anglo-Saxon culture, from the 6th century to 1066, are relatively uncommon.  Those that have been found include both hoards of coins and hoards of jewellery and metalwork such as sword hilts and crosses.  The Staffordshire Hoard is the largest Anglo-Saxon hoard to have been found, comprising over 1,500 items of gold and silver. More Anglo-Saxon artefacts have been found in the context of grave burials than hoards in England. These include major finds from Sutton Hoo in Suffolk, Taplow in Buckinghamshire, Prittlewell, Mucking and Broomfield in Essex, and Crundale and Sarre in Kent.

Pictish hoards

Hoards associated with Pictish culture, dating from the end of Roman occupation in the 5th century until about the 10th century, have been found in eastern and northern Scotland.  These hoards often contain silver brooches and other items of jewellery.

Viking hoards

Hoards associated with the Viking culture in Great Britain, dating from the 9th to 11th centuries, are mostly found in northern England and Orkney, and frequently comprise a mixture of silver coins, silver jewellery and hacksilver that has been taken in loot, some coins originating from as far away as the Middle East.

Later Medieval hoards

Hoards dating to the later medieval period, from 1066 to about 1500, mostly comprise silver pennies, in some cases amounting to many thousands of coins, although the Fishpool Hoard contains over a thousand gold coins.

Post-Medieval hoards

Most hoards from the post-medieval period, later than 1500, date to the period of the English Civil War (1642–1651), from which time over 200 hoards are known.

See also

 List of hoards in Ireland
 List of hoards in the Channel Islands
 List of hoards in the Isle of Man
 List of metal detecting finds

Notes

Footnotes

References

External links

 Checklist of Coin Hoards from the British Isles, c.450-1180

Archaeology-related lists
Hoards of jewellery
Treasure troves
Lists of hoards in Britain